"I Meant Every Word He Said" is a song co-written by Joe Chambers, Bucky Jones and Curly Putman, and recorded by American country music artist Ricky Van Shelton.  It was released in June 1990 as the third single from the album RVS III.  It peaked at No. 2 on the Billboard Hot Country Songs chart and reached No. 1 on the Canadian RPM country singles chart.

Chart performance

Year-end charts

References

1990 singles
Ricky Van Shelton songs
Songs written by Curly Putman
Steve Buckingham
Music videos directed by Deaton-Flanigen Productions
1990 songs
Songs written by Bucky Jones
Columbia Records singles